Meister (German for "master") is a surname. Notable people with the surname include:

A–G
Abraham Meister (birth name of Al Lewis (actor); 1923–2006), American actor 
Alfred Meister (born 1942), Swiss rower
Alton Meister (1922–1995), American biochemist 
Andi Meister (born 1938), Estonian road engineer and politician
Beat Meister (born 1965), Swiss cyclist
Cornelius Meister (born 1980), German conductor and pianist
David Meister (born 1962), American fashion designer
Doris Meister (born 1952), German swimmer
Ernst Meister (1911–1979), German poet and writer
Erwin Meister, Swiss entrepreneur
Franz Meister, Austrian para-alpine skier.
Gabriella Meister, German billionaire businesswoman
George Meister (1854–1928), American baseball player
Gérard Meister (1889–1967), French swimmer

H–M
Heinz Meister, German board game designer 
John Meister (1863–1923), American baseball player
Joseph Meister (1876–1940), French animal attack victim
Karl Meister (1891–1967), American baseball player
Karl Wilhelm von Meister (1863–1935), German politician
Konrad Meister (1930–2002) was a German pianist 
Linni Meister (born 1985), Norwegian model
Lothar Meister (1931–2021), German cyclist 
Lucas Meister (born 1996), Swiss handball player
Marc-Patrick Meister (born 1980), German football manager 
Michael Meister (born 1961), German politician
Michelle Meister (born 1978), German field hockey umpire
Morris Meister, American school principal and academic administrator

N–Z
Nick Meister (born 1995), Canadian curler 
Nicolas Meister (tennis) (born 1989), American tennis player
Nicolas Meister (footballer) (born 1999), Austrian football player
Nora Meister (born 2003), Swiss Paralympic swimmer
Ralf Meister (born 1962) General Superintendent of Berlin and bishop-elect of Hanover
Rudolf Meister (1897–1958), German general
Siegfried Meister (1938–2017), German billionaire businessman
Simon Meister (1796–1844), German painter
Stefan Meister (born 1970), German yacht racer 
Steve Meister (born 1958), American tennis player
Ulrich Meister (1838–1917), Swiss politician
Urs Meister (born 1958), Swiss gymnast
Viktor Meister (1925–2018), Estonian agronomist and economist
William von Meister (1941–1995), American entrepreneur

Fictional characters
Music Meister, fictional character in Batman: The Brave and the Bold 
Wilhelm Meister, from the 1795 novel Wilhelm Meister's Apprenticeship by Goethe

German-language surnames